Each autumn since 1958, the National Junior College Athletic Association (NJCAA) has hosted men's cross country championships. Since 1991, the NJCAA has had three separate division championships. Teams and individual runners qualify for the championship at regional competitions approximately a week before the national championships, typically held in November.

Qualifying 
The NJCAA splits the country into 24 regions. Of those regions, 15 host regional meets. In order to qualify to participate in the national championships a team must participate in their region championship, if the region holds a championship. If the region does not hold a championship, the teams in the region qualify by default. There are no minimum performance standards to participate in the national championship.

History

Champions 

 Prior to 1991, only a single national championship was held between all members of the NJCAA; Division II existed from 1991-2003 and 2020-present and Division III started in 1991.

 A time highlighted in ██ indicates an NCAA championship record time for that distance at the time.

Titles

Team titles 

 List updated through the 2020 Championships

Individual titles 
 List updated through the 2020 Championships

Appearances 

 List updated through the 2020 Championships

Most team appearances (top 10)

Records 

 Best Team Score: 15
SUNY Cobleskill 

 Most Individual Titles: 2
Bob Gray, Brevard (1967-1968)
Mark Roberts, Central Arizona (1986-1987)
Phillimon Hanneck, South Plains (1990-1991)
Julius Wanjiru, Meridia & Butler (1995-1996)
Eliud Njubi, Dodge City (1998-1999)
Simon Ngata, Butler (2001-2002)
Obed Mutanya, Central Arizona (2003-2004)
Stephen Sambu, Rend Lake (2008-2009)
Harry Mulenga, Central Arizona (2013-2014)
Gilbert Kigen, Central Arizona (2015-2016) 

 Best Individual Time, 5 miles: 23:26.4
Robin Holland, Alleghany County (1976) 
Best Individual Time, 8 kilometers: 22:36
Tyson David, Central Arizona (2006)

See also 

 NCAA Men's Division I Cross Country Championship
 NCAA Men's Division II Cross Country Championship (from 1958)
 NCAA Men's Division III Cross Country Championship (from 1973)
 Pre-NCAA Cross Country Champions

References

External Links 
https://www.njcaa.org/sports/mxc

Men's athletics competitions